2009 VA is an asteroid that came within  of Earth on 6 November 2009 making it the third closest non-impacting approach of a cataloged asteroid.

With a diameter of only , scientists think that even if it had been on a direct collision course with Earth, it would have likely burned up in the atmosphere. The space rock made its pass by Earth just fifteen hours after its discovery.

The asteroid was first discovered by the Catalina Sky Survey at the University of Arizona. It was determined that the object would make a pass well within the orbit of the Moon, but would not strike Earth. The object passed so close to Earth that its orbit was modified by Earth's gravity.

See also
 2008 TC3
 2010 RF12, 2010 RX30, 2010 TD54 - a similar-sized asteroids that passed Earth in 2010
 List of notable asteroids#Record-setting close approaches to Earth for other, closer approaches
List of asteroid close approaches to Earth in 2009

References

External links 
 Small Asteroid 2009 VA Whizzes By The Earth
 
 
 

Minor planet object articles (unnumbered)

20091106
20091106